Yeşilköy is a neighborhood, former administrative status: village, of Sivrihisar district in Eskişehir Province, Turkey.

Formerly, the village was named "Acı Yaylası", and was subordinated to the Aşağı Kepen village.

Main economy of the village is agriculture and husbandry.

The Sivrihisar Aviation Center and the M.S.Ö. Air & Space Museum in the aviation center are located just east of Yeşilköy.

Population

References

Villages in Eskişehir Province
Sivrihisar District